Splash (tag lined Star Diving Show) is a short-lived South Korean reality television series produced by SM C&C and broadcast in 2013 on MBC, based on the Celebrity Splash! format created by Dutch company Eyeworks. The show was pre-recorded. After four episodes, the show was cancelled after several celebrities were injured.

References

South Korean reality television series
South Korean television series based on non-South Korean television series
MBC TV original programming
Television series by SM C&C
2013 South Korean television series debuts